Velestovo may refer to:
 Velestovo, Montenegro
 Velestovo, Ohrid, North Macedonia